Roy Mayne (May 16, 1935 – January 5, 1998) was an American professional stock car racing driver. He was a driver in the NASCAR Winston Cup Series from 1963 to 1974.

References

External links

1935 births
1998 deaths
NASCAR drivers